Elizaveta Kulichkova was the defending champion, but chose not to participate.

The top seed Wang Qiang won the title, defeating Liu Fangzhou in an all-Chinese final, 6–2, 6–2.

Seeds

Main draw

Finals

Top half

Bottom half

References 
 Main draw

Blossom Cup - Singles
Industrial Bank Cup